New Rags is an album by Jack DeJohnette released on the German ECM label in 1977.

Track listing 
"Minya's the Mooch" – 11:22
"Lydia" – 3:43
"Flys" (Alex Foster) – 6:05
"New Rags" – 9:08
"Steppin' thru" (Alex Foster) – 10:30

All compositions by Jack DeJohnette except as indicated

Personnel 
 Jack DeJohnette – drums, piano
 John Abercrombie – electric guitar, electric mandolin
 Alex Foster – tenor and soprano saxophones
 Mike Richmond – bass, electric bass

production
 Dieter Bonhorst – Layout Design
 Martin Wieland  Engineer
 Lajos Keresztes – Cover Photo

References 

1977 albums
Jack DeJohnette albums
ECM Records albums
Albums produced by Manfred Eicher